{{Infobox person
| name               = Aljo Bendijo
| image              = 
| imagesize           = 250
| caption            = Aljo Bendijo as one of the hosts of Good Morning Boss shown simulcast on PTV 4.
| birthname          = Alexes Joseph Rubia Bendijo
| birth_date         = 
| birth_place        = Davao City, Philippines
| alma_mater         = Holy Cross of Davao CollegePolytechnic University of the PhilippinesArellano University School of Law
| education          =AB Broadcast Communication (AB)Bachelor of Laws (LL.B.)
| years_active       = 1995–present
| occupation         = Journalist, newscaster, radio commentator
| alias              = 
| status             = 
| nationality        =  Filipino
| known_for          = TV Patrol DavaoHoy Gising!TV PatrolSapul Kayo Dyan!Magandang Umaga BayanHataw BalitaNewsWatch Aksyon BalitaOne Morning CafeBatingaw/Teledyaryo: Final EditionGood Morning BossNews @ 6Sonshine NewsBlastIsyu at BatasPTV NewsRadyoBisyonUlat BayanDaily Info| family             = 
| spouse             = Melanie Galita (m. 2012)
| children           = Nyquollo Bendijo and
Nicole Tupas
| mother             = Alice Marquez
| relatives          = 
| credits            = 
| agent              = ABS-CBN News and Current Affairs (1995–2004)  RPN News and Public Affairs (2006–2007)  Media ng Bayan (2007–2012; 2015–present)
| URL                = 
}}

Aljo Bendijo (born Alexes Joseph Rubia Bendijo; February 6, 1974) is a Filipino broadcast journalist.

Early life and background

Aljo Bendijo was born as Alexes Joseph Rubia Bendijo on February 6, 1974, in Davao City and is the eldest of three children. He started out having part-time jobs as waiter and janitor while in college. He took up AB Mass Communication for two years at the Ateneo de Davao University before moving to Holy Cross of Davao College. He also obtained a degree in Broadcast Communication at Polytechnic University of the Philippines and pursued law at Arellano University School of Law in Pasay City where he earned his Bachelor of Laws degree (LL.B.) in 2016.

Career
1995–2004: ABS-CBN News career
Bendijo started his television career at ABS-CBN Regional Network Group's Davao station in 1995 while obtaining his college degree and hosted a public-service program on the station's regional radio station DXAB. He then became anchor of TV Patrol Southern Mindanao with Girlie Balaba in 1997 following a reformat in the program. It was renamed TV Patrol Davao.

He then rose to national fame when he was first TV reporter in ABS-CBN Manila of Hoy Gising anchored by Ted Failon and Connie Sison on May 8, 2000, and the former national reporter and by named as one of the three anchors in the reformat of the main TV Patrol on March 5, 2001. He joined after Noli De Castro left as anchor to participate at the 2001 Senatorial elections, alongside returning anchor Korina Sanchez and then-interim anchor Henry Omaga-Diaz. His anchoring skills were absolutely commended by the management that they gave him his own show, Sapul Kayo Diyan!, which aired on Saturdays at 10:30pm. Aside from these three shows, Bendijo also excelled as one of the field reporters of the News & Current Affairs Division.

He bagged the "Best New Male TV Personality" award at the 15th PMPC Star Awards for Television in 2001 and a KBP Golden Dove awardee for Best TV Newscaster in 2001  . Following his anchor stint, he was named as one of the hosts of the morning show Magandang Umaga, Bayan (MUB) and was its newsreader, alongside Katherine de Castro, on March 5, 2002.

In 2003, he was not seen on TV Patrol for unknown reasons and following this, the newscast underwent a reformat change adding Julius Babao to the roster, joining Sanchez. He left MUB also after a year, ending his 9-year career in the network.

2006–2007: Various TV appearances
Bendijo was seen in 2006 anchoring Hataw Balita  on UNTV, following his three-year hiatus from TV, with Daniel Razon, Jay Sonza and lawyer Mel Mauricio (Razon and Sonza had been ABS-CBN anchors, and then transferred to GMA with Mauricio), hosting the Hataw Balita segment. He left the show and transferred to RPN. In the network, he became one of the first anchors of RPN Action News (later became NewsWatch Aksyon Balita) with former ABS-CBN talents Erwin Tulfo and Connie Sison for a year, which replaced Arangkada Balita, anchored by then-Teledyaryo anchor and former TV Patrol anchor Angelique Lazo.

2007-present: Stint at People's Television Network (PTV)
After his stint at RPN and UNTV, Bendijo then moved to the government-owned NBN 4. He became the main host of the morning show One Morning Cafe with Veronica Baluyut-Jimenez from 2007 to 2010. He anchored the late-night flagship newscast Batingaw (which became Teledyaryo: Final Edition) with Kathy San Gabriel and Cathy Villar from 2008 to 2012. On September 1, 2015, he again joined People's Television Network's morning show Good Morning Boss as host and one of the main anchors of PTV's flagship news program News @ 6 now became an anchor of PTV News with Kathy San Gabriel and Ria Fernandez.

He hosted Isyu at Batas with De La Salle University Law School Vice Dean and Law professor Atty. Antonio "Butch" Jamon Jr. at DZAR 1026. The program deals with legal opinions on different issues of national interests and at the same time extending free legal advises especially to less fortunates and indigents. 

On September 12, 2016, Bendijo assumed as main anchor for RadyoBisyon aired live from Monday to Friday, 6:00 to 7:00 am, over PBS Radyo ng Bayan (now Radyo Pilipinas 1), PTV 4 and IBC 13 with co-host Czarinah Luzuegro. RadyoBisyon words of "radio" and "television" is the national morning newscast of Media Ng Bayan. 

He hosted Hamon-Bendijo, an issue based commentary radio program with Dean Butch Jamon also with Radyo ng Bayan 738 kHz right after RadyoBisyon. He formerly anchored Radyo Pilipinas News Nationwide, with Alan Allanigue on Radyo Pilipinas. He currently hosts BIRADA BENDIJO, a news and commentary radio program, on Radyo Pilipinas 738 khz.

In July 2022, he was designated by President Bongbong Marcos as general manager of PTV.

Other activities
Business ventures
Aside from his anchor stint, Bendijo tried merchandise and retail business in Imus, Cavite. He also managed the band Sidecrash, which had been known as 12 Months to Pay. The band is composed of five members who are also Davaoeños.

Public image
He was named as one of the Top 10 Cutest newsmen in the country'' by spot.ph. in 2010 and a KBP Golden Dove awardee for Best TV Newscaster in 2001.

Personal life 
He has been married to Melanie Galita-Bendijo of Metro Pacific Investments Corporation since 2012.

Filmography

Television

Radio

Notes

References

External links
 
 

ABS-CBN News and Current Affairs people
RPN News and Public Affairs people
People's Television Network
1974 births
Living people
Arellano University alumni
People from Davao City
Filipino radio journalists
Filipino Christians
Filipino evangelicals
Filipino Protestants
Filipino television news anchors
Polytechnic University of the Philippines alumni
Ateneo de Davao University alumni